The Depretis II government of Italy held office from 26 December 1877 until 24 March 1878, a total of 88 days, or 2 months and 26 days.

Government parties
The government was composed by the following parties:

Composition

References

Italian governments
1877 establishments in Italy
1878 disestablishments in Italy